Gabrielle D. "Gabby" West is an American actress. She won a role in Saw 3D in a competition on the reality show Scream Queens.

Life and career
West was born in Los Angeles, California; she graduated from Century High School in 2003.  She attended one semester at North Dakota State University, majoring in English Literature, and a year at a university in Bozeman, Montana. In 2005 she was a production assistant on the TV mini-series Into The West. In 2006, she played Suzy in the short film New Beginnings. In 2007, she moved to Los Angeles, California to pursue an acting career. That same year she also appeared in the short film Linda, as in Beautiful and was a production assistant for the film 3:10 to Yuma.

In 2008, she guest starred on Tim and Eric Nite Live while being a production assistant for both the TV mini-series Comanche Moon and the film Appaloosa. In 2009, she appeared in Brüno as a German and then was cast out of 36,000 applicants on VH1's reality series Scream Queens and later won a role in the 2010 horror film Saw 3D.  West was originally cast in the 2011 remake of Fright Night but she dropped the role, telling DreadCentral, "I was cast in Fright Night (the remake), but unfortunately the role changed, and what they wanted me to do, I wasn't willing to do".  West was cast in the Tim Sullivan segment of  I was a Teenage Werebear, part of the upcoming anthology series Chillerama scheduled to be released 2011. She plays Peggy Lou a "60′s era, Sandra Dee character who goes crazy".

Filmography

References

External links
 

1985 births
American film actresses
American television actresses
Living people
Participants in American reality television series
Reality casting show winners
21st-century American women